Moskva (Máskeý) is a station that serves Line 1 of the Almaty Metro. The station is located behind Sayran station. It was opened on 18 April 2015 as a part of the second stretch of Line 1 between Alatau and Moskva. It was previously part of the western terminus until May 30, 2022 when Line 1 was extended to Bauyrzhan Momyshuly.

The station is located west of the city center, at Abay Avenue east of crossing with Altynsarin Avenue. It is built underground and has one island platform.

References 

Almaty Metro stations
Railway stations opened in 2015
2015 establishments in Kazakhstan